Jim is a studio album by Jamie Lidell. It was released through Warp on 28 April 2008. It peaked at number 8 on the UK Independent Albums Chart, as well as number 183 on the Billboard 200 chart, number 7 on the Billboard Heatseekers Albums chart, and number 23 on the Billboard Independent Albums chart.

Track listing

Personnel
Credits adapted from liner notes.
 Jamie Lidell – vocals, guitar, bass guitar, keyboards, saxophone, kazoo, recorder, drums, percussion, tape
 Mocky – backup vocals, guitar, bass guitar, mandolin, keyboards, drums, percussion
 Gonzales – keyboards, drums, percussion
 Hildur Guðnadóttir – backup vocals, cello
 Linda Lee Hopkins – backup vocals
 Tatiana Heintz – backup vocals
 Joniece Jamison – backup vocals
 Nikka Costa – backup vocals
 Peaches – backup vocals
 Stuart Cole – horns
 David Ralicke – horns
 Brian LeBarton – keyboards
 David Palmer – keyboards
 Shawn Davis – bass guitar, percussion
 Bill Youngman – percussion
 Snax – drum programming

Charts

References

External links
 
 

2008 albums
Jamie Lidell albums
Warp (record label) albums